All Kooked Out! is the debut studio album by New Orleans-based drummer Stanton Moore.

It was recorded entirely live in the studio with no overdubs and no headphones, in a week-long session that also yielded Mysteryfunk, the debut album for Garage A Trois. Prior to this session, producer Dan Prothero worked with Moore on Galactic's first two albums.

When Prothero asked Moore of who he'd like to play on his solo debut album he thought of eight-string guitarist Charlie Hunter and saxophonist Skerik who had both previously sat in with Galactic. Moore stated getting "Charlie Hunter and Skerik together would just be insane 'cause they're both just really fun guys to hang around with... quirky... funny and just great musicians." Regarding the album's title according to Moore, Prothero stated approvingly about Hunter, Skerik and Moore, "(you're) the biggest bunch a kookers I've ever met."

Moore's line-up for his instrumental debut album also included several fellow New Orleans musicians. Ben Ellman (long-time associate from Galactic) and Brent Rose (Nightcrawlers) are on tenor saxophone. Matt Perrine (Bonerama) plays sousaphone. Also there is Michael Ray (Sun Ra) on trumpet, Craig Klein (Bonerama) on trombone and Brian Seeger on guitar. Notably, there are no keyboards on All Kooked Out!

This Enhanced CD contains bonus audio and in-studio video.

Track listing
 "Tchfunkta"
 "Common Ground"
 "Green Chimneys"
 "Blues For Ben"
 "Kooks on Parade"
 "Nalgas"
 "Witch Doctor"
 "Boogaloo Boogie"
 "Nobodys Blues"
 "Stanton Hits The Bottle"
 "Farmstead Antiques"
 "Angel Nemali"
 "Honey Island"
 "DATA TRACK" (Enhanced CD)

Personnel

 Stanton Moore – drums, percussion
 Charlie Hunter – eight string guitar
 Skerik – saxophonics, kookification
 Ben Ellman – tenor saxophone
 Matt Perrine – sousaphone
 Brent Rose – tenor and soprano saxophone
 Brian Seeger – guitar

Dan Prothero – producer, engineer, editing, mixing, graphic design, photography, programming

References

External links
 Stanton Moore: All Kooked Out!
 Fog City Records presents: Stanton Moore

1998 debut albums
Stanton Moore albums
Fog City Records albums